Holma is a monotypic genus of Central African dwarf spiders containing the single species, Holma bispicata. It was first described by G. H. Locket in 1974, and has only been found in Angola.

See also
 List of Linyphiidae species (A–H)

References

Endemic fauna of Angola
Linyphiidae
Monotypic Araneomorphae genera
Spiders of Africa